West Papuan may refer to:
 someone or something of, from, or related to, West Papua
 West Papuan languages, a group of languages

Language and nationality disambiguation pages